Chasen Nicholas Balisy (born February 2, 1992) is an American former professional ice hockey forward who played for the Florida Panthers in the National Hockey League (NHL) and was originally drafted by the Nashville Predators, 170th overall, in the 2011 NHL Entry Draft.

Playing career
Balisy played three seasons within the USA Hockey National Team Development Program before committing to play collegiate hockey with Western Michigan University then of the Central Collegiate Hockey Association. In his freshman year with the Broncos in the 2010–11 season, he was selected to the CCHA All-Rookie team having contributing with 12 goals and 30 points in 42 games. Balisy gained NHL attention and was selected in the 6th round, 170th overall, in the 2011 NHL Entry Draft by the Nashville Predators.

At the conclusion of his senior season with the Broncos in the 2013–14 season, Balisy rights were relinquished by the Nashville Predators, entitling him to free agency. On August 28, 2014, he agreed to a one-year American Hockey League (AHL) contract with the St. John's IceCaps, affiliate to the Winnipeg Jets. In his professional debut season with the IceCaps in 2014–15, Balisy was instrumental in the IceCaps offense, leading the team with 21 goals and finishing with 44 points in 73 games.

On June 2, 2015, Balisy was signed to his first NHL contract, agreeing to a two-year, entry-level deal with the Florida Panthers.

In the 2017–18 season, Balisy was assigned by Florida to the Springfield Thunderbirds in the AHL before he received his first recall by the Panthers on October 27, 2017. He made his NHL debut with Florida the following day in a 3-2 shootout defeat to the Detroit Red Wings on October 29, 2017.

As a free agent from the Panthers in the off-season, Balisy signed a one-year, two-way contract with the Ottawa Senators on August 10, 2018.

At the conclusion of his contract with the Senators, Balisy opted for a move abroad, signing a one-year deal as a free agent with German club, Straubing Tigers of the Deutsche Eishockey Liga (DEL), on July 19, 2019.

Balisy remained with the Straubing Tigers for three seasons before concluding his eight-year professional career following the 2021-22 season to return to home state, California.

Career statistics

Regular season and playoffs

International

Awards and honours

References

External links

1992 births
Living people
American men's ice hockey forwards
Belleville Senators players
Ice hockey players from California
Florida Panthers players
Nashville Predators draft picks
Portland Pirates players
St. John's IceCaps players
Springfield Thunderbirds players
Straubing Tigers players
USA Hockey National Team Development Program players
Western Michigan Broncos men's ice hockey players